Cape Dunlop is a rocky point just west of Dunlop Island on the coast of Victoria Land. It was first mapped by the British Antarctic Expedition, 1907–09, under Ernest Shackleton, who named this feature "Rocky Point". It has since taken its name from Dunlop Island.

References 

Headlands of Victoria Land
Scott Coast